Lauren Davis was the defending champion, but lost in the first round to Sachia Vickery.

Julia Görges won the title, defeating Caroline Wozniacki in the final, 6–4, 7–6(7–4).

Wozniacki was in contention for the WTA No. 1 singles ranking at the start of the tournament. She was eliminated from contention when Simona Halep reached the quarterfinals in Shenzhen.

Seeds

Draw

Finals

Top half

Bottom half

Qualifying

Seeds

Qualifiers

Qualifying draw

First qualifier

Second qualifier

Third qualifier

Fourth qualifier

References

External links
 Main draw
 Qualifying draw

ASB Classic - Singles
Singles 2018